Leucanopsis pseudomanda is a moth of the family Erebidae. It was described by Walter Rothschild in 1910. It is found in Peru and Suriname.

References

pseudomanda
Moths described in 1910